Railton Road runs between Brixton and Herne Hill in the London Borough of Lambeth. The road is designated the B223. At the northern end of Railton Road it becomes Atlantic Road, linking to Brixton Road at a junction where the Brixton tube station is located. At the southern end is Herne Hill railway station.

History
The 1981 Brixton riot started here. The George public house was burnt down and a number of other buildings were damaged, and the area became known as the "Front Line". The George was replaced with a Caribbean bar called Mingles in 1981, which lasted in one form or another (later called Harmony) as a late-night mostly Caribbean-British attended club/bar until the 2000s. Despite its reputation as run-down, violent and racially tense – a "no-go" area – it was a hotbed of Afro-Caribbean culture, radical political activity and working-class community.

On 30 October 2022, two people, including the 21-year-old Deliveroo driver Guilherme Messias Da Silva, were killed as a result of a gang-related shooting on Railton Road. Da Silva's moped collided with a vehicle being driven by another man who was able to escape his car before being chased down and fatally shot and who is also believed to have been the intended target of the attack. Unable to be resuscitated, both died at the scene. As of 31 October 2022, no arrests have been made in connection with the killings; the Metropolitan Police have appealed for witnesses.

Notable people
 Pearl Alcock
 Winifred Atwell opened "The Winifred Atwell Salon" at 82a Railton Road in 1956
 Rotimi Fani-Kayode lived and died at 151 Railton Road
 Darcus Howe 
Leila Hassan, editor of Race Today
 Linton Kwesi Johnson
 C. L. R. James lived and died at 165 Railton Road, where in 2004 English Heritage erected a blue plaque.
 Olive Morris lived at 121 Railton Road

Notable organisations
 198 Contemporary Arts and Learning
 121 Centre at 121 Railton Road
The centre was home to a bookshop, a cafe, a meeting room, and offices for organisations such as The Anarchist Black Cross and the Faredodgers Association.
It also hosted the legendary club night Dead by Dawn, and early sets by artists such as Hectate.
It was squatted as the 121 Centre from 1981 to 1999, making it one of London's longest continuous squats. When it was evicted, Railton Road held a number of street parties mourning the loss of the important community asset.
The building has now been converted into flats.
 Brixton Black Women's Group at 121 Railton Road
 Black Panther Movement
 South London Gay Community Centre, GLF and Brixton Fairies at number 78
The building has now been knocked down and converted into luxury apartments, with no reference to its past
 Race Today Collective at 165 Railton Road

Gallery

See also 

 Herne Hill

References

External links 
 Then and Now: Railton Road by Effra Parade
 121 Centre, Railton Road - 1981-1999
 Railton Road, Herne Hill, c. 1950

Streets in the London Borough of Lambeth
Brixton
Herne Hill